Richard Francis Hayes (1882 – 16 June 1958) was an Irish politician, historian and medical doctor. He was a volunteer and fought in the Easter Rising in 1916 and was involved in the Garristown and Ashbourne fighting.

He was elected as a Sinn Féin MP for Limerick East at the 1918 general election. In January 1919, Sinn Féin MPs who had been elected in the Westminster elections of 1918 refused to attend the British House of Commons and instead assembled in the Mansion House, Dublin as a revolutionary parliament called Dáil Éireann. Hayes could not attend as he was imprisoned by the British authorities at the time.

During the War of Independence he was interned in the Curragh Camp. He was elected at the 1921 elections as a Sinn Féin Teachta Dála (TD) for Limerick City–Limerick East and was released after the truce.  He supported the Anglo-Irish Treaty and voted in favour of it. He was re-elected at the 1922 general election as a pro-Treaty Sinn Féin TD and subsequently as a Cumann na nGaedheal TD at the 1923 general election.

He resigned from the Dáil in January 1924 and retired from politics. He later became Irish Film Censor (1941–1954) and Director of the Abbey Theatre. As a historian, he was a leading authority on Irish connections with France from the seventeenth to nineteenth centuries. He authored several major historical studies, including The Last Invasion of Ireland: When Connacht Rose (1st ed. 1937), which has been reappraised by Guy Beiner as a groundbreaking book for its use of oral traditions alongside more conventional archival sources. Other titles include Ireland and Irishmen in the French Revolution (1932), Irish Swordsmen of France (1934), Old Irish Links with France (1940), and Biographical Dictionary of Irishmen in France (1949), alongside numerous articles. For his work on the Irish military in France, he received the Légion d'honneur.

He was a hard-working and much-loved doctor. Frank O'Connor records that he deduced, correctly, that their mutual friend George William Russell had terminal cancer  simply because Russell (who had moved to England)   in a letter to O'Connor complained of what he believed to be colitis. When O'Connor  showed Hayes  the letter he read it quickly and  said  "I am sorry but that is cancer, not colitis."

For several years he was the closest friend of Frank O'Connor, who acknowledged the extraordinary help Hayes gave him in researching  The Big Fellow, his biography of Michael Collins. After some years, however, the friendship cooled, and the portrait of Hayes in O'Connor's memoir My Father's Son, is surprisingly unflattering, given their earlier closeness.

He is buried in Deansgrange Cemetery.

References

Sources
 Robert Brennan (1950), Allegiance
 Guy Beiner (2007), Remembering the Year of the French: Irish Folk History and Social Memory (University of Wisconsin Press)
 Ray Bateson (2015), Deansgrange Cemetery and the Easter Rising

External links
 

1882 births
1958 deaths
Early Sinn Féin TDs
Cumann na nGaedheal TDs
Members of the Irish Republican Brotherhood
Members of the 1st Dáil
Members of the 2nd Dáil
Members of the 3rd Dáil
Members of the 4th Dáil
Members of the Parliament of the United Kingdom for County Limerick constituencies (1801–1922)
UK MPs 1918–1922
Politicians from County Limerick
20th-century Irish medical doctors